Hacohen is a surname, and is a variant of Cohen, the Hebrew word for "priest". Notable people with the surname include:

Aviad Hacohen (born 1962), Israeli lawyer and legal scholar
David Hacohen (1898–1984), Israeli politician
Menachem Hacohen (born 1932), Israeli rabbi, writer and politician
Moshe Hacohen (1874–1950), Tunisian rabbi
Ran HaCohen (born 1964), Israeli writer and translator
Shalom Hacohen (1772-1845), Hebrew dramatist and poet

Hebrew-language surnames